The Eurymedon Bridge is a Roman bridge over the river Eurymedon (modern Köprüçay River) near Selge in Pisidia in southern Turkey. It is part of the road winding up from the coastal region Pamphylia to the Pisidian hinterland. Located 5 km north of the village Beşkonak in a sparsely settled area, the bridge crosses the Eurymedon high above the valley bottom.

The excellently preserved structure is 14 m long and 3.5 m wide (with a roadway of 2.5 m). The clear span of its single arch is c. 7 m, the thickness of its voussoirs, which were set without the use of mortar, 60 cm. The building technique and the sturdy stonework point to a construction date in the 2nd century AD, a time when Selge was flourishing.

Forty-two km downstream at Aspendos, the Eurymedon is crossed by another extant old bridge.

Gallery

See also 
 List of Roman bridges
 Roman architecture
 Roman engineering

References

Sources

External links 

Roman bridges in Turkey
Deck arch bridges
Stone bridges in Turkey
Pamphylia
Pisidia
Buildings and structures in Antalya Province
Arch bridges in Turkey